Xavier Amorós i Solà (7 April 1923 – 18 July 2022) was a Catalan politician, poet, and writer. He served as a member of the Senate of Spain from 1986 to 1992. Solà died in July 2022 in Reus, at the age of 99.

References 

1923 births
2022 deaths
Catalan-language poets
Catalan-language writers
Members of the Senate of Spain
Members of the 3rd Senate of Spain
Members of the 4th Senate of Spain
Socialists' Party of Catalonia politicians
People from Reus
20th-century Catalan people